Qatar Tourism (QT), a branch of the Government of Qatar, is the apex body responsible for the formulation and administration of the rules, regulations and laws relating to the development and promotion of tourism in Qatar. This ministry is responsible for tourist attractions and accommodations for travelers, including all tourism related products and services, to expand and diversify of Qatar's tourism industry, as well as building up the role of tourism in the GDP of the country and its future growth and social development.

QT’s work is guided by the Qatar National Tourism Sector Strategy 2030 (QNTSS), published in February 2014, to set out a plan for the industry’s future development.

References

External links
 Qatar Tourism
 Qatar's Ministry of Interior
 Visas for visitors

Economy of Qatar
Environment of Qatar
Society of Qatar
Tourism in Qatar
Tourism agencies